According to the current taxonomy, the Myosoricinae are a subfamily of shrews.  As such, they form one of three main types of shrews, the other two being the red-toothed shrews and the white-toothed shrews.  They are the only one of the three to be found exclusively south of the Sahara Desert, and so they have been described in English as the African shrews, but also many white-toothed shrews are in Africa and therefore this term is more generally used for shrews from Africa in general. (Another vernacular term is African white-toothed shrews, though this perpetuates the same confusion.) The subfamily has three genera and 20 species: 
Subfamily Myosoricinae
Genus Congosorex - Congo shrews
Phillips' Congo shrew, C. phillipsorum
Greater Congo shrew, C. polli
Lesser Congo shrew, C. verheyeni
Genus Myosorex - forest and mouse shrews
Babault's mouse shrew, M. babaulti
Montane mouse shrew, M.  blarina
Bururi forest shrew, M. bururiensis
Dark-footed mouse shrew, M. cafer
Eisentraut's mouse shrew, M. eisentrauti
Geata mouse shrew, M. geata
Nyika mouse shrew or Nyika burrowing shrew, M. gnoskei
Kahuzi swamp shrew, M. jejei 
Kabogo mouse shrew M. kabogoensis
Kihaule's mouse shrew, M. kihaulei
Long-tailed forest shrew, M. longicaudatus
Meester's forest shrew, M. meesteri
Oku mouse shrew, M. okuensis
Rumpi mouse shrew, M. rumpii
Schaller's mouse shrew, M. schalleri
Sclater's mouse shrew, M. sclateri
Thin mouse shrew, M. tenuis
Forest shrew, M. varius
Kilimanjaro mouse shrew, M. zinki
Genus Surdisorex - African mole shrews
Aberdare mole shrew, S. norae
Mount Kenya mole shrew, S. polulus
Mount Elgon mole shrew, S. schlitteri

According to Furió et al.(2007) the group should have the status of tribe, as a relict of the primitive subfamily Crocidosoricinae.

References